Dennis R. Bell (born June 2, 1951) is an American former professional basketball player. Born in Cincinnati, Ohio, he played collegiately for Drake University. He was selected by the New York Knicks in the 5th round (83rd pick overall) of the 1973 NBA Draft. He played for the Knicks (1973–76) in the NBA for 63 games.

Bell is the president of Recreational Debut, a non-profit housing organization he started in 1984. It is located in Grand Rapids, Michigan where it has assists low and moderate income families purchase homes. Recreational Debut has assisted families in Florida, Michigan, Arizona and Ohio.  Recreational Debut is also helps high school student athletes obtain athletic scholarships to colleges around the United States. Bell received his BA from Drake University and his MBA from Grand Valley State.

References

External links

1951 births
Living people
20th-century African-American sportspeople
21st-century African-American people
African-American basketball players
Allentown Jets players
American men's basketball players
Basketball players from Cincinnati
Drake Bulldogs men's basketball players
Gulf Coast State College alumni
Junior college men's basketball players in the United States
New York Knicks draft picks
New York Knicks players
Small forwards